NEA or nea may refer to:

Organizations
 Bureau of Near Eastern Affairs, in the U.S. Department of State
 Ta Nea (The News), a newspaper in Greece
National Economic Association, an American scholarly society
 National Editorial Association, previous name of the National Newspaper Association
 National Education Association, an American educational labor union
 National Endowment for the Arts, an independent agency
 National Energy Action, a UK charity
 National Environment Agency, a Singapore government agency
 Nepal Electricity Authority
 Nepal Engineers Association
 New England Airlines, by ICAO airline designator
 New Enterprise Associates, an American venture capital firm
 Newspaper Enterprise Association, syndicate
 Northeast Action, American political organization
 Northern Examining Association, a former examination board in the United Kingdom
 Nuclear Energy Agency

Other
 Nea (given name)
 Nea (singer)
 National Emergencies Act
 New England Aquarium, an aquarium in Boston, Massachusetts
 New Epoch Art
 Near-Earth asteroid
 Nea Ekklesia (New Church), a church built in Constantinople in the ninth century
 Nea River, in Sør-Trøndelag, Norway
 Nea (New Comedy) in the Ancient Greek comedy of the last period, from 323–BCE onward